Mount Cole is a mountain over  high, on the west side of Shackleton Glacier, between the mouths of Forman Glacier and Gerasimou Glacier, in the Queen Maud Mountains. It was discovered and photographed by U.S. Navy Operation Highjump, 1946–47, and named by the Advisory Committee on Antarctic Names for Nelson R. Cole, Aviation Machinist's Mate with U.S. Navy Squadron VX-6, who lost his life in a helicopter crash in the McMurdo Sound area in July 1957.

References
 

Mountains of the Ross Dependency
Dufek Coast